Newton of Kinkell is a scattered crofting township, along with Newton of Ferintosh in Dingwall, Black Isle, Ross-shire, Scottish Highlands and is in the Scottish council area of Highland.

Newton of Ferintosh is another crofting township, which lies directly to the east of Newton of Kinkell. The village of Conon Bridge is 2 miles northwest of Newton of Kinkell and 2 miles northeast of Muir of Ord.

Populated places on the Black Isle